Nybyen is a small settlement located on the southern outskirts of Longyearbyen, on the island of Spitsbergen, in the Svalbard archipelago of Norway. The name is Norwegian and translates as The New Town.

History and features

The settlement was founded in 1946-47 for the miners of "mine 2B" (later named Julenissegruva, "Santa Claus Mine"), one of the area's many coal mines. During the second half of the 20th century the "New Town" became a notable part of Longyearbyen, with the town's only shop for a period, though commercial activity has moved back down the valley. Today its character reflects that of Svalbard's more mixed economy (tourism, research and mining) with two guesthouses (Guesthouse 102 and Spitsbergen Guesthouse) utilising the former miners' barracks, as well as being home to the Svalbard Art Gallery & Craft Centre, and nearby is the Huset restaurant, club and cinema. Most students at the University Centre in Svalbard (UNIS) live in six renovated mining barracks in Nybyen.

Geography

Nybyen falls within the community of Longyearbyen (incorporated in 2002) though it is somewhat detached from the town. Between the two settlements is the Longyearbyen School.

Sverdrupbyen

To the west, just on the other side of the river, is a place called Sverdrupbyen, named after Einar Sverdrup (1895–1942), the managing director of the mining company Store Norske Spitsbergen Kulkompani. He was the leader of Operation Fritham in World War II, but died in the course of that operation, which attempted to secure Svalbard for the Allies. Nybyen is sometimes alternatively known as Østre Sverdrupbyen ("East Sverdrupbyen"). Most buildings in Sverdrupbyen, including those of Mine 1B, were destroyed in a fire drill in the 1980s before they became protected under the cultural heritage preservation law.

References

External links

UNIS — Map of Longyearbyen and Nybyen
Guesthouse 102 — History and information about Nybyen

Longyearbyen
Populated places established in 1946
Populated places in Svalbard
1946 establishments in Norway